The Buford City School District is a school district in Gwinnett County, Georgia, United States. The Georgia Department of Education announced Buford Academy as a 2014 Highest-Performing School. Buford City Schools (BCSS) serves approximately 5,000 students in a campus-like setting of five schools, two performing arts centers, and a multi-purpose arena. Buford City Schools boasts beautiful facilities, including a brand new Buford High School, and has a rich tradition of success in academics, arts, and athletics. In October 2020, Niche again named BCS the Number One School District in Georgia—an honor that has been bestowed upon the district for six consecutive years.

Schools
Buford Elementary School
Buford Academy
Buford Senior Academy
Buford Middle School
Buford High School

Superintendent Resignation after Alleged Use of Racist Term
Dr. Geye Hamby was put on administrative leave on August 21, 2018, after recordings surfaced in which a person (allegedly Hamby) repeatedly and casually used the n-word. Hamby resigned on August 24, 2018, as a result of the recordings.

See also
List of school districts in Georgia (U.S. state)

References

External links
Buford City Schools website

School districts in Georgia (U.S. state)
Education in Gwinnett County, Georgia
Buford, Georgia